The Rapid Pass is a smart card automated fare collection system used on participating public transit systems in Dhaka, the capital of Bangladesh. Rapid Pass card readers were implemented on a trial basis in 2017. Full implementation began in January 2018 and it was rolled out across rapid transit stations, railway stations, bus stops and terminals, and transit vehicles on many different transit systems.

History
Japan International Cooperation Agency provided technical assistance and 73% of the total budget for the project. The authority concerned decided to introduce Rapid Pass service on trial basis for buses operated by Bangladesh Road Transport Corporation plying on Abdullahpur–Motijheel route in the city in May 2017. Sheikh Hasina, prime minister of the country, inaugurated the card service of the Rapid Pass on 4 January 2018. The project was said to be completed in 2019, which was in the process of setting up a clearing house bank for multiple transport services which was implemented by Dutch-Bangla Bank. In the meeting on bus route rationalization organized on 21 June 2022, it was decided to ensure the use of Rapid Pass in all modes of transport in Dhaka.

Card usage

This card can be used to purchase tickets for BRTC bus services, BIWTA launches, Bangladesh Railway train services, MRT and BRT.

Purchase and reload
For the card, one has to register and purchase the card from any of eight branches of Dutch-Bangla Bank. The branches are Motijheel Local Office Branch, Motijheel Foreign Exchange Branch, Elephant Road Branch, Uttara Branch, Banani Branch, Gulshan Circle-1 Branch, Gulshan Branch and Sonargaon Janpath Branch. These branches also act as recharge point. Besides, cards can be purchased and recharged at 10 bus counters located at House Building, Uttara, Banani, Shahbag, Motijheel, Rampura, Notun Bazaar, Gulshan-2, Shooting Club, Dhaka Chaka Banani Stopage and Police Plaza.

Criticisms
Even after the launch of Rapid Pass, it was not made available for all bus services. On the other hand, bus operators are unwilling to use it to collect fares as they cannot collect more than the government fixed fare.

References

Contactless smart cards
2018 introductions
Fare collection systems
Transport in Dhaka
Japan International Cooperation Agency